Deep Creek is a tributary of the Mojave River,  long, in San Bernardino County, California.

Course
It initially flows southwest, through the communities of Arrowbear and Running Springs, before turning north. It is joined by Hooks Creek from the west; a dam on Little Bear Creek, a tributary of Hooks Creek, forms Lake Arrowhead. A short distance downstream is Aztec Falls, a popular swimming area at a waterfall along Deep Creek.

The creek continues north, at the bottom of a deep gorge through mountainous wilderness, receiving Holcomb Creek and Coxey Creek from the right before turning west, forming a canyon between the San Bernardino Mountains and Ord Mountains. The Deep Creek Hot Springs are located along the stream where it turns to the west.

Drainage basin
Most of the drainage basin is located in the San Bernardino National Forest. For most of its length it is a remote, swift-flowing mountain stream, with a riverbed characterized by "deep pools and boulder strewn reaches". Deep Creek derives most of its water from snowmelt in the winter and spring, and has very low flows in autumn. The creek is also prone to flash flooding in the summer due to monsoon storms.

Deep Creek is one of the most ecologically diverse areas of the San Bernardino National Forest. At lower elevations, where the drainage approaches the Mojave Desert, the dominant vegetation type is chaparral, and creosote bush, chamise and California buckwheat are common. At middle elevations oak and pinyon-juniper woodland are common, with mixed conifer forests in the highest elevations. The endangered southwestern arroyo toad is found in the lower part of Deep Creek. 

The creek is designated a Wild Trout Stream by the state of California, and is home to populations of rainbow and brown trout.

See also
List of rivers of California

References

Deep Creek (Mojave River)
Deep Creek (Mojave River)
Deep Creek (Mojave River)
Rivers of Southern California
Wild and Scenic Rivers of the United States